Sarband District (Baxš-e Sarband) is a district (bakhsh) in Shazand County, Markazi Province, Iran. At the 2006 census, its population was 14,492, in 3,664 families.  The District has one city: Hendudur. The District has two rural districts (dehestan): Hendudur Rural District and Malmir Rural District.

References 

Shazand County
Districts of Markazi Province